Spokane Valley Mall is a shopping mall located at 14700 East Indiana Avenue in Spokane Valley, Washington, United States. It is about 9.5 miles away from NorthTown Mall in Spokane which is the largest mall in Eastern Washington. The current anchors are JCPenney and Macy's, and it includes a Regal Cinemas with 12 screens.

The mall opened in 1997 featuring Sears, JCPenney, and The Bon Marche.

On November 7, 2019, it was announced that Sears would be closing this location a part of a plan to close 96 stores nationwide. The store closed in February 2020.

References

External links
 Spokane Valley Mall

Brookfield Properties
Shopping malls in Washington (state)
Buildings and structures in Spokane County, Washington
Tourist attractions in Spokane County, Washington
Spokane Valley, Washington
Shopping malls established in 1997